Yusnelvis Espinosa Prevals (born 14 February 2000) is a Cuban footballer who plays as a defender for the Cuba women's national team.

International career
Espinosa capped for Cuba at senior level during the 2020 CONCACAF Women's Olympic Qualifying Championship qualification.

References

2000 births
Living people
Cuban women's footballers
Cuba women's international footballers
Women's association football defenders
21st-century Cuban women